Released is the fourth studio album by the American singer Patti LaBelle. It was released by Epic Records on March 14, 1980, in the United States. The album featured the hits "I Don't Go Shopping", written by previous collaborator David Lasley and musician Peter Allen, and the title track, "Release (The Tension)", which was written by funk legend Allen Toussaint, who produced the entire album. The title track found some international success upon its release while "I Don't Go Shopping" was her first top 40 R&B charted single since 1977. Along with her frequent collaborator, James "Budd" Ellison, LaBelle lyrically co-wrote the last five songs on the album.

Track listing
All tracks produced and arranged by Allen Toussaint.

Personnel 
 Patti LaBelle – vocals 
 Allen Toussaint – Yamaha electric grand piano, vocoder (3, 8), RMI Harmonic Synthesizer (8), acoustic piano (9)
 James Budd Ellison – acoustic piano 
 Sam Henry Jr. – Fender Rhodes
 Edward Levon Batts – guitars, backing vocals 
 Ron Smith – guitars 
 David Barard – bass
 Herman "Roscoe" Ernest III – drums 
 Miguel Fuentes – percussion 
 Kenneth Williams – percussion 
 Albert White – alto saxophone 
 Carl Blouin – baritone saxophone 
 Harold Deffies – baritone saxophone
 Paul McGinley – tenor saxophone 
 James Rivers – tenor saxophone solo (1), alto saxophone solo (7)
 Jim Duggan – trombone
 Michael Genevay – trombone 
 Jerome Verges – trombone 
 Clyde Kerr Jr. – trumpet 
 James Weber – trumpet
 Vernon Manuel – backing vocals 
 Jay Van Hall – backing vocals

Production 
 Patti LaBelle – associate producer, album concept 
 James Budd Ellison – associate producer 
 Skip Godwin – recording, mixing 
 Danny Jacobs – recording, mixing 
 Jack Skinner – mastering at Sterling Sound (New York City, New York).
 John Berg – art direction, cover design 
 Andrea Klein – art direction, cover design 
 Hiro 51 – photography

Charts

References

Album chart usages for Billboard200
Album chart usages for BillboardRandBHipHop
1980 albums
Patti LaBelle albums
Albums produced by Allen Toussaint
Epic Records albums